Mihailo Radunović (born 27 March 1996) is a Montenegrin professional basketball player, currently playing as a [Terme Olikia] in the Slovenian League.

He made his debut for Budućnost in the Adriatic League match against Levski in October 2014, and spent a further six weeks of the season playing as a dually registered player for Ulcinj.

References

External links 
 Profile at abaliga.com
 Profile at eurobasket.com
 Profile at fiba.com

1996 births
Living people
ABA League players
Forwards (basketball)
KK Budućnost players
KK Lovćen players
KK Mornar Bar players
Montenegrin men's basketball players